The Ministry of Foreign Relations (MRREE) is the ministry of the Government of Uruguay that is responsible for planning, directing and executing the foreign policy and international relations of the Republic.

It is also responsible for maintaining and strengthening the country's relations with the different countries of the world, as well as the proper functioning of Uruguayan embassies and consulates in countries where there is representation, and also the missions and state services abroad. This government department is headquartered in the Santos Palace, in Barrio Centro, Montevideo. The Minister of Foreign Relations is more commonly known as Canciller, or Chancellor. Since 6 July 2020 the ministry is headed by the diplomat Francisco Bustillo.

Headquarters 

It is commonly referred to in Uruguayan media and diplomatic jargon as the Palacio Santos, after the historical building which since 1955 has housed the ministry (originally the residence of President Máximo Santos in the late 19th century). It is located in downtown Montevideo.

This building is one of the major historic structures in the Uruguayan capital, and has been the subject of prominent documentary publicity.

List of Ministers of Foreign Relations

See also

Foreign relations of Uruguay
List of diplomatic missions in Uruguay
List of diplomatic missions of Uruguay
List of Ministers of Foreign Relations of Uruguay
Mercosur
Visa requirements for Uruguayan citizens

Bibliography
Cancilleres del Uruguay: reseña biográfica de los ministros de relaciones exteriores de la República Oriental del Uruguay, 1828-2002 (Gerardo Caetano, Gabriel Bucheli, Jaime Yaffé e Instituto Artigas del Servicio Exterior. Ed. Ministerio de Relaciones Exteriores, Instituto Artigas del Servicio Exterior, 2002)

References

External links

Uruguayan Ministry of Foreign Relations 

Foreign relations of Uruguay
Uruguay
Foreign Relations
Uruguay, Foreign Relations
1828 establishments in Uruguay